Neshota River is a  river in east-central Wisconsin It passes through Richard J Drum Memorial Forest before merging with the Devils River to form the West Twin River north of Cherney Maribel Caves County Park. The source of the river is located in southeastern Brown County, Wisconsin.

The water quality of the river is fair near Neshota County Park, but the quality deteriorates quickly, as it is impacted by runoff from nearby farms. A large manure spill in the 1990s contributed to the poor quality of river.

The city of Two Rivers, Wisconsin was named for the confluence of the Neshota River and what was then known as the Mishicott River. The Mishicott River has since been renamed the East Twin River.

Major tributaries
Major tributaries of the Neshota River include:

Black Creek
Denmark Creek
King Creek

References

Rivers of Brown County, Wisconsin
Rivers of Wisconsin
Rivers of Manitowoc County, Wisconsin